Sir John Edensor Heathcote, (c1757 – 1822) was a Stoke-on-Trent industrialist and owner of Longton Hall in Longton, Staffordshire which he rebuilt in 1778.

He was born in Longton Hall as the son of Michael and Rachel Heathcote. In 1780, he married Anne Gresley (1755–1797) in Knypersley, Staffs, the daughter of Sir Nigel Gresley, 6th Baronet of Drakelow and Elizabeth Wynne.

He was knighted in 1784, the year in which he served as High Sheriff of Staffordshire.

He died in 1822, his estate passing to his son Richard Edensor Heathcote MP.

References
 The Borough of Stoke on Trent in the Commencement of the Reign of Queen Victoria John Ward (1848) p 562 (Google Books)
   The History of the County of Stafford, Volume 8 (1963) p 224. The History of Longton from British History Online

1822 deaths
People from Longton, Staffordshire
English knights
High Sheriffs of Staffordshire
Year of birth unknown